Action Pack is a preschool computer animated children's streaming television series developed by Shea Fontana for Netflix. Created by William Harper, the series premiered on January 4, 2022. A second season was released on June 6.

Premise
The series follows the Action Pack, a quartet of superheroes-in-training taught by their teacher Mr. Ernesto and his robotic dog Plunky.

Voice cast

Main
 Sydney Thomas as Treena, a girl who uses powers controlling plant life, fitting in with her love of nature. Her color is green, and her badge has a flower shape. She serves as the Action Pack's de facto leader. She uses the "Petal Power Shield" and the "Awesomer Blossomer" baton gadget, which lets her sprout vines for swinging or grabbing and uses a dandelion-like balloon to float. Her powers are upgraded in the final episode of season 2, where she obtains the power to create vine cages and speak to plants. Even as a civilian, she is an excellent gardener and can instantly make plants grow.
 Oscar Reyez as Watts, a boy who uses powers controlling electricity. His color is blue, and his badge has a pair of lightning bolts. Watts is the most energetic and impatient of the team, and can morph his legs into lightning bolts for super speed and flight and throw lightning bolts or ball lightning. 
 Julieta Cortes as Wren Reyes, a girl who can use animal abilities. Her color is yellow, and her badge has a cat's paw print. Wren is the most empathetic team member, and she often uses the powers of a butterfly's flight, a polar bear's strength, a fox's smell, an alligator's protection, a mouse's small size, and a cheetah's speed. She loves animals and claims she can communicate with them.
 Nevin Kar as Clay Patel, a boy who uses powers controlling plasma and forcefields. His color is red, and his badge has a sun shape. A pacifist, Clay is the most reserved member of the team, and his body is composed of a form of plasma that allows him to shapeshift and stretch or deform his body. He can also see through things with his "plasma vision" and create "invinci-balls" that protect against anything.
 Giancarlo Sabogal as Mr. Ernesto Action, the adult mentor of the Action Pack and great nephew of Great Uncle Action, who is the founder of the Action Academy. He is the patient and kind instructor at the Action Academy and the Action Pack's mentor. Although he doesn't have any super special powers of his own, Mr. Ernesto is empathetic toward the evil villains and provides the Action Pack with all the support and wisdom they need in order to save the day. He is accompanied by a robotic dog named Plunky, who acts as his trusty companion and teaching assistant who keeps the Action Pack company and alerts them with any important information that they need to know.

Recurring
 Hartley Wexler as Dinah Rex, a young girl obsessed with dinosaurs. This obsession has led her to perform several acts of villainy throughout town, mainly carried out by her robotic dinosaur minions. She is a determined girl who wants everyone to turn into dinosaurs, since she is part dinosaur herself. She eventually reforms and becomes the Action Pack's friend.
 Lotus Blossom as Abby, Gabby, and Maddy, three identical triplets who live in Hope Springs. Gabby has a yellow streak in her hair and Abby has red, both usually being happy. Maddy, however, has a purple streak in her hair, and unlike her sisters is usually seen with somewhat emo behavior.
 Kimberly Brooks as Jackie,
 Kimberly Brooks as Nelly,
 Giancarlo Sabogal as Hot Dog Vendor, a hot dog vendor with no definite name who lives up to his occupation.
 Giancarlo Sabogal as Mr. Grumpman, an old man who often shows up on the street to whine about how he usually gets caught in the middle of chaos happening in Hope Springs, likewise/whereas the Action Pack have saved his life on many occasions, but he never displays gratitude afterwards.
 Briana Leon as Paleo Paulette, a professional palaeontologist at the Hope Springs Natural History Museum.
 Daisuke Tsuji as Mr. Chang,
 Paty Lombard as Ira the Superintendent, the superintendent of the Action Pack's school, who hears all, sees all. She keeps things in order with her patient but rather firm ways. Some claim that she's not easily impressed, however several episodes showing her impressed with the Action Pack’s rescues and other stuff don't provide support for this claim.
 Rhys Darby as Mr. Villainman, an evil magician and textbook villain who originally intends to steal a powerful magical wand. In one episode it is revealed that he simply wants to grant his childhood birthday wish, which Clay gives him.
 Sander as Cold Snap, a young boy with white skin who enjoys playing in cold weather. He has the power to control the weather. Although he originally intends to force everyone to have winter fun, despite their disinterest, he later uses his powers for good to make ice cream.
 Jason Hightower as Phil Donut, the local baker of Hope Springs.
 Brennley Brown as Pepper (a.k.a. Baker Bandit), a baker who is determined to outdo Phil Donut, using numerous pastry-themed weapons to aid in her villainous methods. She originally wants to sabotage Phil's bakery to make her own business thrive, but like most of the series' villains, she reforms after a number of episodes.
 John Eric Bentley as Crimson Cape/Rupert, a former student and current full time superhero. He is Watts' idol.
 Jakari Fraser as Mason, a friend of Treena's and a young boy with rock-like skin. He is eager and tends to be too rambunctious with his powers, which can lead to collateral damage. His powers include rolling up into a sphere shape and super strength.
 Jason Maybaum as Teddy Von Taker, a boy whose family is known for their compulsive desire to steal, himself included. As his name suggests, he always causes trouble by seeking to pilfer what isn't rightfully his, with various attachments including a vacuum-cleaner, a magnet, a net, and a hook. He usually sends his army of sentient toys (most notably his teddy bears) to serve under him. So far, he has the most appearances, meaning he probably hates the Action Pack the most and is the most frequently recurring villain in the series who remains unlikable.
 Eleanor Noel Delgadillo as Sky Patel, Clay's younger sister with a similar power set.
 Poonam Basu as Mrs. Patel, Clay and Sky's mother from an Indian descent who owns a mobile library. Her family celebrates Rakhi.

Minor
 Jim Conroy as Chuckles, a  clown villain who later becomes the Crimson Cape's sidekick.
 Wanda Arriaga as Grandelivery, Wren's grandmother and a superhero with mail-related powers.
 Lynden as Tella-Portanya, a small girl (and reformed villain) who can teleport.
 Lotus Blossom as Felicia the Fear Fighter, an ancient superhero from a hundred years ago, whose mission is to help anyone face their fears. She is also the devoted owner of a supernatural superhero cat named Super Meowzers (whom Watts was initially afraid of due to his fear of cats), who was accidentally and magically brought to life by the touch of the "Scepter of Paw-er" tablet.
 Jakari Fraser as Rom, a boy with technology powers. He is from a black Korean descent. His name is derived from the term "read-only memory".
 Mia Armstrong as Eon, a girl who can pause time. She is friends with the Action Pack and has Down syndrome.
 Kimberly Brooks as Dinah Rex's Mother, the unseen mother of Dinah Rex who is only heard in the series.
 Callie C. Miller as Tella-Portanya's Mother, the unseen mother of Tella-Portanya who is only heard in the series.
 Melanie Minichino as Eon's Mom, the unseen mother of Eon who is only heard in the series.
 Billie Schloss as Gamer Girl, a villain who controls a real-life, deadly video game.
 Jason Hightower as Santa, a superhero who saves Christmas with the help of the Action Pack.

Episodes

Series overview

Season 1 (2022)

Season 2 (2022)

Specials

Production
The series was first announced back in September 2021 as part of four Netflix Original Preschool shows targeted at 2-6 year olds.

Release
Action Pack premiered on January 4, 2022, globally on Netflix. A trailer was released on December 7, 2021.

References

External links

2022 American television series debuts
2022 British television series debuts
2022 Canadian television series debuts
2020s American animated television series
2020s American children's comedy television series
2020s British animated television series
2020s British children's television series
2020s Canadian animated television series
2020s Canadian children's television series
2020s preschool education television series
American children's animated comedy television series
American children's animated superhero television series
American computer-animated television series
American preschool education television series
British children's animated comedy television series
British children's animated superhero television series
British computer-animated television series
British preschool education television series
Canadian children's animated comedy television series
Canadian children's animated superhero television series
Canadian computer-animated television series
Canadian preschool education television series
Animated preschool education television series
Animated television series about children
Animated television series by Netflix
English-language Netflix original programming
Netflix children's programming
Child superheroes
Superhero schools